Sir Daniel Charles Williams  COG (born 4 November 1935) is a Grenadian lawyer who served as Governor-General of Grenada from 8 August 1996 until 27 November 2008. He was formally appointed by Queen Elizabeth II on 9 August 1996 after having been nominated by Prime Minister Keith Mitchell.

Williams is the only former Grenadian governor-general who was active in politics prior to his appointment. He was elected to the Parliament of Grenada as a New National Party candidate in 1984. From 1984 to 1989 Williams served in various ministerial roles in the Herbert Blaize government, including a brief stint as acting prime minister in 1988. Williams resumed his private law practice after the NNP was defeated at the 1990 elections.

In 1997, he was knighted by Queen Elizabeth II, with the Order of Knight Grand Cross of St. Michael and St. George (GCMG).

He founded the law firm Danny Williams & Co.

References

External links
 "Danny Williams & Co. Attorneys-At-Law and Notaries Public" Official website. Retrieved Nov 1, 2010.

1935 births
Alumni of the University of London
Knights Grand Cross of the Order of St Michael and St George
Living people
Attorneys General of Grenada
Governors-General of Grenada
20th-century Grenadian lawyers
New National Party (Grenada) politicians
People from Saint David Parish, Grenada
Environment ministers of Grenada
Health ministers of Grenada
Housing ministers of Grenada
Women's ministers of Grenada